Pussycat Dolls Present: The Search for the Next Doll is the first season of Pussycat Dolls Present that premiered on March 6, 2007 on The CW, and aired for a total of eight weeks. It was a joint venture between Ken Mok's 10x10 Entertainment, Pussycat LLC, Interscope A&M Records, Wonderland Sound and Vision, and Warner Horizon Television.

The series was filmed from September to November 2006, and followed a group of young women as they went through an audition process to join the girl group, The Pussycat Dolls. The contestants, who also lived together during the course of the series, were groomed by the group's founder and the series' creator and co-producer, Robin Antin, and were judged on their vocal and dancing ability. The winner went on to join the Pussycat Dolls as the act's seventh member, and appeared in the series but performed with the group only once before opting to go solo.

In the UK, the show aired on T4 (the Channel 4 weekend teenage block programming slot) on April 1, 2007. In Australia, the show aired on Network Ten on April 1, 2007.

Finalists

Makeovers
Jaime: Dyed blonder & restyled
Sisely: Extensions sewn in
Mariela: Straightened
Anastacia: Thinned & straightened
Melissa S.: Darker & later on bangs added
Chelsea: Bangs added & trimmed
Melissa R.: Trimmed ends
Asia: Blonde streak extensions added

Elimination Chart
Colour key

Notes:
 On Week 1, Robin Antin announced the final 9 girls. Eliminating Shauntae, Catherine, Kelli, Eva, Sandra, Anjelia, Jasmin, Natascha and Robyn.
 On Week 2, Asia was called out by Mark McGrath, but not by Robin Antin.
 On Week 4, group 1 was called out as "group 1", no specific name order was given.
 On Week 6, Chelsea and Anastacia were deemed the worst dancers and as such didn't take part in the challenge.
 On Week 7, Melissa S was called before Chelsea but eliminated anyway.
 On Week 8, Chelsea was called first and eliminated. Robin then called Asia as the winner.

Performances

Episodes

Episode 1: The Auditions

The 18 semi-finalist are given songs as follow:

Rehearsal does not go smoothly, as Anjelia gets sick, and Sisely struggles with her group because she doesn't want to rehearse too late to preserve her energy. Sandra as well as the Hot Stuff group struggle with their vocals while Chelsea and Shauntae struggle with their dancing. 
The girls are then taken to a Pussycat Dolls concert and meet the Dolls. On the way back home and overnight Jaime, Ewa, Chelsea, Sandra, Melissa S., Mariela, Natascha and Jasmin all get sick, while a now cured Anjelia rehearses with Anastacia.
On their performance, despite being sick, the girls wow the judges and Nicole Scherzinger except for the group who performed I Don't Need a Man. After deliberation, the nine finalists are called.

Episode 2: Welcome to the Dollhouse

The girls move in and after a video message by the Dolls (like each week), are given their song assignment as follow

They are then taken to a restaurant where they discover their first challenge to be exotic dancing in a class cage in the restaurant. Despite Jaime overcoming her lack of confidence, Asia wins and gets immunity. During rehearsal, Brittany is criticized for "dancing like a stripperella" while Jaime struggles with her vocals.
At the performance, Ron and Kim are introduced as judges and Melissa S. forgets her words but it is eventually Brittany who is sent home for her too sexual moves.

Episode 3: The Transformation

The girls get a makeover by Jonathan Antin, Robin's brother and taken to a dinner with the judges. The girls embrace their new looks, especially Jaime who says the makeover boosted her self-confidence. In the challenge, the girls go into the recording studio singing Don't Cha's chorus and despite Mariela's vocal improvement, it is Melissa S who wins immunity.
The girls perform as follow:

The judges decide that the first group did the best, Mariela was praise for her improvement and strong performance with no negative feedback like every girl had. While the judges say that it is Melissa R.'s worst night yet, it is Sisely, who has struggled throughout rehearsal despite being given a rock song, who lands in the bottom with the still not confident Jaime who is eliminated for not standing out.

Episode 4: She Dances Like a Drag Queen

At this week's challenge the girls are assigned to perform a self-choreographed routine with a male dancer and Mariela impress the judges with her creativity, gaining immunity. Robin picks Chelsea and Asia to be leaders and Sisely winds up getting chosen last. Chelsea chooses girls she hasn't worked with and does a good job as a leader. Asia doesn't manage too well, being distracted by Sisely's earlier comments about her dancing like a drag queen.
The girls perform as follow:

Guys join the girls for a partner dance challenge which Mariela wins. At the final performance Chelsea's group is deemed the best, despite having a weak rehearsal. The ever-struggling Sisely and Melissa S, who has trouble showing her "inner doll" are in the bottom two. Sisely is then eliminated as it becomes evident that her uniqueness is a weakness.

Episode 5: Vegas, Baby

The girls are taken to Vegas where they perform "Tainted Love" after learning the routine on their moving tour bus. At the Challenge performance, Anastacia felt uncomfortable in her dress, Chelsea gave strongest vocal performance, Mariela and Melissa S. had the loudest cheers. After the public votes were tallied, Melissa S. is crowned winner. Asia rubs some girls the wrong way after deeming the fancy food they are given disgusting and asking for a hamburger instead of cuisine while Anastacia continues to struggle with her weight.
The girls are then given the following song assignments, making both Mariela and Anastasia worried, Mariela because she is paired up with the best vocalist in the top 6 and Anastasia because her teammate has immunity.

At the final performance, Melissa R. is criticized for crying on stage but is safe due to being in the best duo. Mariela and Chelsea land in the bottom two due to their shortcomings in singing and dancing respectively. In the end, a teary eyed Robin eliminates Mariela.

Episode 6: Dancin' with the Dolls

Chelsea expresses her feelings on Mariela's elimination saying that she felt she took away Mariela's dream and did not want her to go home. Anastacia feels her biggest indirect competition was gone. The girls are given a Wait a Minute routine to learn where Chelsea and Anastacia struggle. Robin then tells them that only 4 girl will perform it on stage with the Dolls to get immunity, however she makes the last minute decision to cut both Anastacia and Chelsea out of the performance and they stay on the bus. At the performance, Melissa R. gains immunity despite almost getting too soon on stage. 
As they come back, the ongoing tension between Melissa S. and Chelsea reach their highest point as Melissa uses Chelsea's name as a synonym for bad dancer. Melissa R. breaks down because she struggles with her identity and sheltered past but is comforted by Melissa S.
This week the girls perform a medley as one group and Chelsea is put in a swing, which Melissa S. believes is giving her an excuse to not dance.

After losing her microphone in the tub she danced in and sang badly, Melissa S. lands in the bottom two once again, but it is Anastacia who is eliminated due to her inability to use her figure to her advantage.

Episode 7: The Fantastic Four

The girls are taken on a fake promo tour, including a photoshoot, an interview and a commercial for a deodorant. Melissa S and Melissa R struggle with their commercial, Chelsea ends up singing it to show off her best asset, and Asia ad libs a bit, talking about The Dolls's confidence. At the interview, Melissa S deems Chelsea the girl with the least potential, reigniting tension but is Asia who wins, though she does not get immunity but to have her commercial run nationally.
This week the girls have to perform "Beep"'s dance routine and Chelsea struggles, making Melissa S. happy as she can't evade dancing this week. However she gets the routine down with the help of Asia. The girls are also given solo assignments as follow:

 Group performance - "Beep" <small>(dance routine)</small>

Asia is criticized for struggling on a hard song while Chelsea and Melissa S. land in the bottom two, Chelsea for her dancing problem, despite pulling off a strong performance this night and Melissa S for her lack of consistency. Ultimately, an overjoyed Chelsea joins Asia and Melissa R in the finale and Melissa S is sent home.

Episode 8: The Girl Who Becomes a Doll

As the girls come home, Melissa R. voices her relief at Melissa S.' elimination, leading Asia to call her phony at their last dinner with the judges. Tension continues throughout the night and Chelsea is woken up by the other girls' fight.
The girls learn their song assignment as follows:

 Group performance - "Lady Marmalade"

 Final performance - "Don't Cha"

All of them struggle due to the tension, leading Robin to tell them that none of them are ready. Melissa R. and Asia continue their fight during the group rehearsal, while a bemused Mikey and Chelsea look on. They then sort out their differences and hug each other. 
At the performance the judges are wowed by all of the girls. But, Chelsea's inability to dance gets her eliminated.

Robin then names Asia the winner and she is joined on stage by the Dolls and performs Don't Cha with them for the first time. Nittollano was set to officially join the Dolls after they would finish touring, but after the season finished airing, she only appeared with the Dolls again at the CW Upfronts Event on May 17, 2007, and shortly after, it was announced that she departed from the group to pursue a solo career.

After the show, Melissa Smith, Melissa Reyes and Chelsea Korka performed the song Fever with the English burlesque group Girlesque' at the Fashion Cares'' event on May 12, 2007 in Toronto, Canada. This led fans to believe that they had started their own group which turned out to be false as Chelsea Korka was in a group named the Paradiso Girls.

References

External links
 

The CW original programming
Television series by Warner Horizon Television
2000s American reality television series
2007 American television series debuts
2007 American television series endings
The Pussycat Dolls
Television series by Wonderland Sound and Vision